McCoy is an American comedy-drama series that starred Tony Curtis and aired on NBC-TV during the 1975–1976 season.

Synopsis
The series stars Tony Curtis as a con man who, along with a team of friends, "out-cons" bad guys in order to steal back their ill-gotten gains and return the loot to its rightful owners. The schemes were elaborate and laced with satirical humor.  The series bears resemblances to the then-recent film The Sting, as well as to the contemporary series Switch and the British literary character Simon Templar. Co-starring with Curtis was Roscoe Lee Browne as a nightclub comedian.

Episodes

Production and reception
The series was produced in the format of two-hour telefilms, that were broadcast as part of the NBC Sunday Mystery Movie as one of several rotating series that would air once a month. Other series involved in the Universal Television franchise package were Columbo, McCloud, and McMillan & Wife. However, McCoy failed to garner the same ratings as its fellow programs and was cancelled after an initial 90-minute pilot TV movie ("The Big Ripoff") and four two-hour episodes were broadcast. A novelization of the pilot, written by Linda Stewart as "Sam Stewart", titled for the series, was published by Dell in 1976, and reprinted as McCoy: The Big Rip-Off, under W.H. Allen's Star imprint in the United Kingdom.

See also
''Leverage

External links
 
 

1970s American comedy-drama television series
1975 American television series debuts
1976 American television series endings
English-language television shows
NBC Mystery Movie
NBC original programming
Television series by Universal Television